Bolshoye Shumakovo is a rural locality and the administrative center of Shumakovsky Selsoviet Rural Settlement, Kursky District, Kursk Oblast, Russia. Population:

Geography 
The village is located on the Mlodat River (a left tributary of the Seym), 95 km from the Russia–Ukraine border, 14 km south-east of the district center – the town Kursk.

 Climate
Bolshoye Shumakovo has a warm-summer humid continental climate (Dfb in the Köppen climate classification).

Transport 
Bolshoye Shumakovo is located on the road of regional importance  (Kursk – Bolshoye Shumakovo – Polevaya via Lebyazhye), in the vicinity of the railway halt Zaplava (railway line Klyukva — Belgorod).

The rural locality is situated 14 km from Kursk Vostochny Airport, 111 km from Belgorod International Airport and 197 km from Voronezh Peter the Great Airport.

References

Notes

Sources

Rural localities in Kursky District, Kursk Oblast